The Fun Republic Mall is a shopping mall located at Vipin Khand in Gomti Nagar, Lucknow. The mall has a Built-up area of more than 970,000 sq ft, including 5,80,000 sq ft of gross leasable (retail) area. It was inaugurated in 2007. It was built by Zee Group in the mid-2000s at a cost of Rs 800 million. It comprises retail outlets, cinema, food court and 60-room boutique hotel. The gaming zone that previously existed is now discontinued. It has parking for 550 cars and average footfall of 25,000-28,000 on weekdays and 37,000-40,000 on weekends.

See also
List of shopping malls in Northern India

References

External links
 Fun Republic Mall

Buildings and structures in Lucknow
Shopping malls in Uttar Pradesh
Economy of Lucknow
Shopping malls established in 2005
2005 establishments in Uttar Pradesh